German submarine U-554 was a Type VIIC U-boat of Nazi Germany's Kriegsmarine during World War II. The submarine was laid down on 1 December 1939 at the Blohm & Voss yard in Hamburg as yard number 530, launched on 7 November 1940, and commissioned on 15 January 1941 under the command of Kapitänleutnant Dietrich Lohmann.

Design
German Type VIIC submarines were preceded by the shorter Type VIIB submarines. U-554 had a displacement of  when at the surface and  while submerged. She had two shafts and two  propellers.

U-554 was fitted with two  torpedo tubes fitted at the bow, fourteen torpedoes, one  SK C/35 naval gun, 220 rounds, and a  C/30 anti-aircraft gun. The boat had a complement of between forty-four and sixty.

Service history
Assigned to the 24th U-boat Flotilla, the U-boat served throughout the war under a number of commanders, but always as a training vessel, seeing no combat service. She was transferred to the 22nd U-boat Flotilla on 1 July 1944, and then to the 31st U-boat Flotilla on 1 February 1945.

The submarine was scuttled on 5 May 1945 near Wilhelmshaven, in position , only a few days before the German surrender.

References

Bibliography

External links

World War II submarines of Germany
German Type VIIC submarines
U-boats commissioned in 1941
1940 ships
Ships built in Hamburg
Operation Regenbogen (U-boat)
Maritime incidents in May 1945